Manusmuria is a village in Jharkhand, India. It has a population of nearly 9800.

Near by places are Chakulia, Baharagora, Kumardubi, Parulia, Khanda mouda, and Jagannathpur - parulia.

References

Villages in East Singhbhum district